The 2016–17 FC Rostov season was the club's eighth successive season in the Russian Premier League, the highest tier of football in Russia. Rostov also take part in the Russian Cup, entering at the round of 32 stage and the Champions League for the first time, entering at the third qualifying round.

Season events
On 6 August 2016, Kurban Berdyev resigned as manager, with Dmitri Kirichenko being appointed as the club's caretaker-manager. On 9 September 2016, Ivan Daniliants was appointed as the club's new head-coach. On 9 September 2016, Kurban Berdyev was appointed as the FC Rostov vicepresident.

Squad

Out on loan

Transfers

Summer

In:

Out:

Winter

In:

Out:

Friendlies

Competitions

Russian Premier League

Results by round

Matches

League table

Russian Cup

UEFA Champions League

Qualifying rounds

Group stage

UEFA Europa League

Knockout stage

Squad statistics

Appearances and goals

|-
|colspan="14"|Players away from the club on loan:

|-
|colspan="14"|Players who left Rostov during the season:

|}

Goal scorers

Disciplinary record

References

External links

FC Rostov seasons
Rostov
Rostov
Rostov